Biseni (Buseni) is one of the coastal languages of Nigeria. According to Ethnologue, it is not fully intelligible with Inland Ijaw.

References

Languages of Nigeria
Ijoid languages
Indigenous languages of Rivers State